Samsom Gebreyohannes (born 7 February 1992) is an Eritrean long-distance runner who competes in cross country and half marathon races.

Competition record

Personal bests
3000 metres – 8:04.77 (2011)
5000 metres – 13:32.97 (2010)
10,000 metres – 28:28.05 (2012)
10 kilometres – 28:12 (2015)
20 kilometres – 57:08 (2014)
Half marathon – 1:00:13 (2014)
Marathon – 2:14:25 (2017)

References

1992 births
Living people
Eritrean male long-distance runners
Eritrean male marathon runners
Eritrean male cross country runners
Athletes (track and field) at the 2015 African Games
African Games competitors for Eritrea
21st-century Eritrean people